Mogoditshane Fighters are a football (soccer) club from the Mogoditshane in Botswana.

The club's nickname is "The Brazilians".

Achievements 
Mascom Premier League: 4
 1999, 2000, 2001, 2003
Botswana Challenge Cup: 3
 1999, 2000, 2003
Botswana Independence Cup: 1
 2000

Performance in CAF competitions
CAF Champions League: 1 appearance
2002 - Preliminary Round

CAF Cup Winners' Cup: 2 appearances
2000 - First Round
2001 - First Round

Current squad

External links
GeoCities site

Football clubs in Mogoditshane
1925 establishments in Bechuanaland Protectorate